The Arlington Hotel was a historic hotel along U.S. Route 40 in Zanesville, Ohio, United States.  Built in 1883 in the Italianate style, it was listed on the National Register of Historic Places in 1982.  It has since been demolished.

An arsonist set two fires in the building in 1970, causing the evacuation of 43 guests. The hotel closed in 1980.

References

External links
, including photo

National Register of Historic Places in Muskingum County, Ohio
Hotel buildings completed in 1883
Demolished hotels in the United States
Hotels in Ohio
Hotel buildings on the National Register of Historic Places in Ohio
U.S. Route 40
Buildings and structures in Zanesville, Ohio
Italianate architecture in Ohio
Demolished buildings and structures in Ohio